Aleksa Radanov (born February 1, 1998) is a Serbian professional basketball player for Peristeri of the Greek Basket League.

Early career
Radanov grew up with Crvena zvezda youth teams. He won the 2014 Euroleague NIJT. He lost finals of the 2014–15 and 2015–16 Euroleague NGT season.

Professional career 
Prior to the 2014–15 season, Radanov signed his first professional contract with Crvena zvezda. Since the 2015–16 season, he played on loan for another Serbian team FMP. In April 2018, he was recalled from loan to Crvena zvezda. In August 2019, he was loaned to FMP for the 2019–20 season. Radanov returned to Crvena zvezda on July 29, 2020, signing a two-year deal.

On 13 July 2021, Radanov signed for Bosnian club Igokea.

On 12 July 2022, Radanov signed for Greek club Peristeri.

Career achievements
 Serbian League champion: 3  (with Crvena zvezda: 2017–18, 2018–19, 2020–21)
 Bosnian League champion: 1 (with Igokea: 2021–22)
 Adriatic League champion: 3  (with Crvena zvezda: 2014–15, 2018–19, 2020–21)
 Adriatic Supercup winner: 1  (with Crvena zvezda: 2018)
 Serbian Cup winner: 1  (with Crvena zvezda: 2020–21)
 Bosnian Cup winner: 1 (with Igokea: 2021–22)
 Euroleague IJT champion: 1  (with Crvena zvezda U-18: 2013–14)

References

External links

 Aleksa Radanov at aba-liga.com
 Aleksa Radanov at eurobasket.com
 Aleksa Radanov at euroleague.net
 Aleksa Radanov at fiba.com

1998 births
Living people
ABA League players
Basketball League of Serbia players
Basketball players from Belgrade
KK Crvena zvezda players
KK FMP players
KK Igokea players
Peristeri B.C. players
Serbian expatriate basketball people in Bosnia and Herzegovina
Serbian expatriate basketball people in Greece
Serbian men's basketball players
Shooting guards
Small forwards